The Bird Who Saved The World is the soundtrack album to the film of the same name by William Wei.  It is also the second EP by Wei. The EP was released on January 12, 2012, by Linfair Records. It has three tracks, 'The Day of Bird' (鳥日子) performed by Wei and two instrumentals tracks. 'The Day of Bird' is the theme song of the movie and was written by Wei about his fears of an uncertain future after completing his military service.

Track listing

Music videos

References

2012 EPs
William Wei albums